Apilocrocis excelsalis is a moth in the family Crambidae. It was described by Schaus in 1912. It is found in Costa Rica and Honduras, south to Argentina.

References

Moths described in 1912
Spilomelinae
Moths of Central America
Moths of South America